This is a list of the 300 members who were elected to the Hellenic Parliament in the September 2015 Greek legislative election.

Composition of Parliament

Members of Parliament 
Note: The table of changes below records all changes in party affiliation.

Changes 
 19 November 2015: Gabriel Sakellaridis (Syriza, Athens A) resigned from parliament withdrawing from parliamentary politics.
 19 November 2015: Nikolaos Nikolopoulos was expelled from the Parliamentary Group of Independent Greeks.

See also 
 September 2015 Greek legislative election
 Second Cabinet of Alexis Tsipras

Notes

References

Sources 
Ministry of Interior
 
 
 

2015 (September)
2015 in Greek politics